Taibaiella chishuiensis is a Gram-negative, rod-shaped, strictly aerobic and non-motile bacterium from the genus of Taibaiella which has been isolated from water from the Chishui River from Guizhou in China.

References

Chitinophagia
Bacteria described in 2014